James Elisha Folsom Sr. (October 9, 1908 – November 21, 1987), commonly known as Jim Folsom or Big Jim Folsom, was an American politician who served as the 42nd governor of the U.S. state of Alabama, having served from 1947 to 1951, and again from 1955 to 1959. He was the first Governor of Alabama born in the 20th century.

Early life
Born in Coffee County, Alabama, in 1908, Folsom was of English ancestry. Folsom was among the first southern governors to advocate a moderate position on integration and improvement of civil rights for African Americans. In his Christmas message on December 25, 1949, he said, "As long as the Negroes are held down by deprivation and lack of opportunity, the other poor people will be held down alongside them."

Before serving in the United States Army and United States Merchant Marine during World War II, Folsom had been an insurance salesman. He attended the University of Alabama, Samford University in Birmingham, and George Washington University in Washington, DC, but he never obtained a college degree.

Before his gubernatorial campaigns, he won a race only once as a delegate to the 1944 Democratic National Convention. He was a strong supporter of keeping US Vice-President Henry A. Wallace on the ticket, rather than replacing him with Harry S. Truman of Missouri, which occurred.

Governor
Folsom was elected governor for the first time in 1946 on a New Deal liberal platform attacking corporate interests and the wealthy. He waged a colorful campaign with a hillbilly band, brandishing a mop and bucket that he said would "clean out" the Capitol. His opponent, Handy Ellis, attacked Folsom by saying his election would threaten segregation laws and encourage communist-backed labor unions.

Historian Dan T. Carter summarized Folsom's democratic ideals thusly: "(T)he three pillars of a democratic society were the Bill of Rights, an activist and compassionate government, and an absolute and unqualified democracy." Folsom warned voters that, in the wake of World War II, which he said was fought "against hatred and violence," those sought to use mischaracterizations of political ideas to divide "race and race, class and class ... religion and religion."

On March 3, 1948, Folsom's name was in headlines across the nation when the 30-year-old Christine Johnston, a widow who had met Folsom in late 1944 while she was working as a cashier at the Tutwiler Hotel in Birmingham, filed a paternity suit against the governor by alleging that he was the father of her 22-month-old son. Undaunted, nine days after the suit was filed Folsom appeared on the sidewalk in front of the Barbizon Modeling School in New York City, where he kissed a hundred pretty models who had voted him "The Nation's Number One Leap Year Bachelor," attracting a crowd of 2500 onlookers and causing a traffic jam. Johnston dropped the suit in June for a cash settlement from Folsom; years later, he admitted to an interviewer that he was indeed the father of Johnston's child.

On May 5, 1948, without prior publicity, Folsom married the 20-year-old Jamelle Moore, a secretary at the state Highway Department, whom he had met during his 1946 campaign and had been dating and seeing "almost daily" since then.

However, despite the paternity suit and other scandals during his administration, he was easily elected to a second non-consecutive term in 1954. The Alabama Constitution then forbade a governor from succeeding himself, a common provision in other southern states at the time. Folsom was 6'8" and employed the slogan "the little man's big friend."

In 1958, Folsom commuted a death sentence imposed on James E. Wilson, an African American sentenced to death for a violent robbery. The Wilson case sparked international protests, but some segregationists called for Folsom not to commute the sentence. Folsom opposed capital punishment, stating that he would always grant clemency in death penalty cases "if I can find some excuse." He regularly paroled and pardoned black convicts, believing they had been unjustly convicted or punished due to their race.

However, Folsom did not intervene in another controversial case; Jeremiah Reeves was electrocuted the same year, which also sparked protests. He later confessed that his silence was solely due to political reasons. Folsom said he "just couldn't" commute the death sentence of a black man who had been convicted of raping a white woman, since it would destroy him politically."I'd never get anything done for the rest of my term if I did that. Hell, things are getting so bad, they’re even trying to take Black & White Scotch off the shelves."Jet. April 10, 1958 issue

Two unsuccessful races
In 1962, Folsom again ran for governor against his one-time protégé George C. Wallace but was defeated. A sardonic slogan that referred to Folsom's reputation for taking graft emerged during that campaign: "Something for everyone and a little bit for Big Jim." Folsom sometimes referred to "the emoluments of office" and once told a campaign crowd, "I plead guilty to stealing. That crowd I got it from, you had to steal it to get it.... I stole for you, and you, and you."

Folsom's campaign was also damaged by a television appearance in which he appeared seriously intoxicated and unable to remember his children's names. Both the appearance and the supposed "slogan" hurt him with the image-conscious middle class.

Folsom ran again for governor in 1966 and faced three other leading Democrats in the primary, former US Representative Carl Elliott, former Governor John Malcolm Patterson, and Attorney General Richmond Flowers Sr. However, the primary winner was none of those candidates but the surrogate for the outgoing Governor George Wallace: his first wife, Lurleen Burns Wallace. In the general election, Lurleen handily defeated the Republican nominee, James D. Martin, a one-term US representative from Gadsden.
 
Folsom was never again elected to public office.

Later life
Folsom ran several times for public office but was not taken seriously by his political opponents. The former governor was plagued by ill health in the last years of his life. A 1976 article in People magazine reported that Folsom was legally blind, with only 5% vision, and nearly deaf.

Folsom died in 1987 in Cullman. His niece, Cornelia Wallace, the daughter of his sister, Ruby Folsom Ellis, was from 1971 to 1978 the second wife of his former rival, George Wallace.

A documentary film about Folsom Big Jim Folsom: The Two Faces of Populism, was produced in 1996 by the Alabama filmmaker Robert Clem and won the 1997 International Documentary Association/ABCNews VideoSource Award and the Southeastern Filmmaker Award at the 1997 Atlanta Film Festival.

In the 1997 TNT film George Wallace, directed by John Frankenheimer, Jim Folsom is played by Joe Don Baker, who was nominated for a CableACE award for his performance. Gary Sinise played Wallace.

Folsom's son James E. Folsom Jr. (dubbed "Little Jim," he is physically large but called this because of his father's nickname) is also a noted Alabama politician. He served as lieutenant governor of Alabama from 1987 to 1993. He assumed the governor's office when Republican Governor Guy Hunt was removed from office after he had been convicted of state ethics law violations. Folsom Jr. ran for a full term as governor in 1994 but was defeated by Republican former Governor Fob James. He decided to re-enter state politics in 2006, qualified, and eventually won the lieutenant governor's position again; he served from 2007 to 2011.

Folsom had nine children, two by his first wife, Sarah, and seven by his second wife, Jamelle Folsom. Folsom's first wife, Sarah Carnley, died in 1944 because of pregnancy complications. Folsom eloped and married his second wife, former First Lady of Alabama Jamelle Folsom, in 1948. They remained married until his death.

See also 
 List of members of the American Legion

References

External links

 Alabama Governor James Folsom (Alabama Department of Archives and History 
 Encyclopedia of Alabama article
 Oral History Interview with James Folsom from Oral Histories of the American South

1908 births
1987 deaths
20th-century American politicians
Burials in Alabama
Democratic Party governors of Alabama
Folsom family of Alabama
George Washington University alumni
Governors of Alabama
Left-wing populism in the United States
Military personnel from Alabama
People from Coffee County, Alabama
People from Cullman, Alabama
Samford University alumni
United States Army personnel of World War II
United States Merchant Mariners of World War II
University of Alabama alumni
Works Progress Administration administrators